Robert Marinier (born 1954 in Sudbury, Ontario) is a Canadian stage actor, playwright and television writer, who was a nominee for the Governor General's Award for French-language drama at the 1997 Governor General's Awards for his play L'Insomnie. For the same play, he was also a Dora Mavor Moore Award nominee for Best Actor in a Play, Mid-Size Theatre division, in 1997.

His 2021 book Un conte de l'apocalypse was the winner of the Trillium Book Award for French Prose in 2022.

He has also been a television writer for the series The Smoggies, Météo+ and Les Bleus de Ramville.

Plays
 1979 - Lafortune et Lachance
 1980 - La Tante
 1982 - L'Inconception
 1984 - Les Rogers (with Robert Bellefeuille and Jean-Marc Dalpé)
 1988 - En camisoles
 1989 - Deuxième souffle (with Dan Lalande)
 1993 - À la gauche de Dieu
 1994 - L'Insomnie
 1997 - But for the Grace of God... (English translation of À la gauche de Dieu)
 1999 - Le golfeur et la mort
 1999 - Contes sudburois (with Jean-Marc Dalpé, Robert Dickson, Paulette Gagnon, Michael Gauthier and Brigitte Haentjens)
 2000 - Big Crunch
 2000 - Univers
 2000 - Je me souviens
 2005 - Épinal

References

External links

20th-century Canadian dramatists and playwrights
21st-century Canadian dramatists and playwrights
Canadian male dramatists and playwrights
Canadian male stage actors
Canadian dramatists and playwrights in French
1954 births
Living people
Writers from Greater Sudbury
Canadian television writers
Franco-Ontarian people
20th-century Canadian male writers
21st-century Canadian male writers
Canadian male television writers